Frithia humilis is a species of plant in the family Aizoaceae. It is one of the few members of Aizoaceae growing endemic to the summer-rainfall region of South Africa. It is restricted to two provinces of South Africa: Gauteng and Mpumalanga. This small plant consists of a cluster of long, succulent leaves that stick out just above the sandy gravel, with a thickened underground rootstock. The leaves lose water and contract during drought, hiding underground and so preventing more water loss.

References

South African National Biodiversity Institute, South Africa.

Flora of South Africa
Aizoaceae